Alan Hammonds (born 4 November 1955) (aka Jordy and Johnny Black) is an English singer-songwriter.  He was born in Horden, County Durham, England.

Career
Alan Hammonds (guitar/vocals) formed the British power pop band Incredible Kidda Band, alongside his brother Graham "Kidder" Hammonds (percussion/backing vocals), in Nuneaton on 10 February 1976. The band experienced several name changes, beginning with the shortening of the name to The Kidda Band, before changing name completely to The Kicks on 7 November 1979.

Hammonds then formed We're Only Human, a British power pop rock band in London on 1 July 1981. We're Only Human disbanded in 1989. After the demise of We’re Only Human, Hammonds concentrated on modelling and acting.

On television, Hammonds he featured in Channel 4 documentary, The Sexhunters, which aired in 1992 and then, in 1995, he secured a minor role in First Knight, starring Richard Gere. 

Returning to music in 2010, he formed Black*Scarr alongside Emma Scarr, and they released their debut album, North n South in 2011. This was followed in 2014 with Middle Aged Love and Better With Age (2017), Deluded (2018) and Drunken Generation (2019). This urban folk country duo consists of two singer-songwriters with different styles and influences, but whose co-writing has collided to produce a collection of honest and gritty songs that move audiences to laughter and tears.  
 
In 2014, he formed The Persecuted a British Americana country pop rock band alongside Steve Botcher (guitar/vocals), Brad Wray (bass/vocals) and Mark Skeggs (drums). They released their debut album, The Persecuted in 2011 and followed this with Britainicana in 2017.

References

External links
 The Incredible Kidda Band Official Website
 The Black*Scarr Official Website
 The Persecuted Official Website
 The Incredible Kidda Band on MySpace
 The Kicks on MySpace
 The We’re Only Human on MySpace
 The Mod Pop Punk Archives
 45 Catalogue

English rock singers
1955 births
English new wave musicians
Living people